85 Sky Tower, formerly known as the T & C Tower or Tuntex Sky Tower, is an 85-story skyscraper in Lingya District, Kaohsiung, Taiwan. Constructed from 1994 to 1997, it is the tallest skyscraper in Kaohsiung, and was the tallest in Taiwan until the completion of Taipei 101 in 2004.

There is no 44th floor in the building (see Tetraphobia); the 43rd floor connects directly to the 45th floor. The pyramid shaped crown is the equivalent of three stories high and is hence marketed as 83–85 to arrive at a round number. There is no elevator access to floors above 80. 

The building was designed by C.Y. Lee & Partners and Hellmuth, Obata & Kassabaum, and has an unusual 'prong' design with two separate 39-floor sections, which merge into a single central tower rising to a spire. This unique design leaves a substantial space below the central part of the tower. The design was inspired by the first Chinese character of the city's name. John W. Milton was Project Director on behalf of Turner International Inc. (New York), a subsidiary of Turner Construction.

The building was owned by the now defunct Tuntex Group, and is mainly offices, but includes residential space, and a department store; and the 85 Sky Tower Hotel (ceased operations) occupies the 38th to 70th floors. An observation deck on the 74th floor offers views over Kaohsiung City, the Love River and Kaohsiung Harbor; it is accessed by high speed elevators that are capable of speeds of 10.17 m/s.

Occupancy 
Floor 34 and 35 are currently leased by Look Hotel Group. The 85 Sky Tower Hotel (ceased operations) occupies floors 37 to 85, and it owns the observation deck. Office space and studio apartments occupy each side of the lower floors.

Atrium 
There is an Atrium that extends from Level 45's Shimmer Ballroom (as of 2015 the entire floor is dark and unoccupied) to Level 83; it is one of the highest continuous atriums in the world.

Gallery

Floor Directory 
80-85: Mechanical / Communication Facility
76-79: Restaurants / Spa (Private Club) (ceased operations)
74-75: Observatory (ceased operations)
46-70: Guest Rooms (ceased operations)
43-45: Meeting Rooms and Ballrooms (no 44th floor) (ceased operations)
38-42: Hotel Facilities (ceased operations)
13-35: Office Residential
12: Nikko Plaza
8-11: Chien-Tai Indoor Amusement Park
2-7: Chien-Tai Daimaru Department Store
1: Lobby

Transportation
The building is accessible within five blocks walking distance west of Sanduo Shopping District Station of the Kaohsiung MRT.

See also
 List of tallest buildings in Taiwan
 List of tallest buildings in Kaohsiung
 List of tallest buildings
 List of tallest freestanding structures in the world
 List of tallest freestanding steel structures

References

External links

 Tuntex Sky Tower on CTBUH Skyscraper Center
Emporis

1997 establishments in Taiwan
Buildings and structures completed in 1997
Lingya District
Residential skyscrapers in Taiwan
Skyscraper office buildings in Kaohsiung
Skyscraper hotels in Kaohsiung
Office buildings completed in 1997